Klerksdorp is located in the North West Province, South Africa. Klerksdorp was also the first capital of the then Transvaal Republic and used to be the home of the first Stock Exchange in the region. It became an important trading town linking Kimberley to Johannesburg. It became home to a mix of farmers, miners and immigrants servicing the two industries.

History

Beginnings (1837/38 and on)
The city was founded in 1837 or 1838 when the Voortrekkers settled on the banks of the Schoonspruit  ("Clear stream"), which flows through the town. Klerksdorp is the oldest European settlement north of the Vaal River, and thus of the former Zuid-Afrikaansche Republiek (Z.A.R), also known as the Transvaal Republic.

He gave plots of land and communal grazing rights on this farm to other Voortrekkers in return for their labour in building a dam and an irrigation canal. This collection of smallholdings was later given the name of Klerksdorp in honour of the first landdrost (magistrate) of the area, Jacob de Clercq.

Gold rush of 1885
As a consequence, thousands of fortune-seekers descended on the small village, turning it into a town with 70 taverns and even a stock exchange of its own. This stock exchange opened its doors in 1888 and soon did a roaring trade, selling as much as the equivalent of R20 000 in one day.

However, the nature of the gold reef demanded expensive and sophisticated equipment to mine and extract the gold, causing the majority of diggers to move away in the late 1890s and leading to a decline in the gold mining industry. This also led to an early demise for the Stock Exchange that stood empty for many years, were converted to a movie theatre in 1912 and finally being demolished 1958. The amalgamation process used to extract the gold from the crushed ore was relatively inefficient and largely contributed to decline. By 1893 the new MacArthur-Forrest process used for gold extraction brought a short-lived revival in the Klerksdorp gold mining industry, but uncertainty created by the Jameson Raid of December 1895 as well as transport problems created by the Rinderpest of 1896 soon led to a near collapse of the industry.

Second Boer War (1899-1902)
During the Second Boer War (1899-1902), heavy fighting occurred in the area, which also housed two large concentration camps, one for Whites (centred on modern day Klerksdorp High School) and a separate one for Africans (situated in the area that is today the Ellaton and Neserhof suburbs).

The most famous of the battles around Klerksdorp, is that of the Battle of Ysterspruit ("Iron Stream"), in which the Boer general Koos de la Rey achieved a great victory. The battle is one of the most celebrated of the general's career, being the battle in which the Boer soldiers pioneered the art of firing from horseback. On April 11, 1902, Rooiwal, near Klerksdorp, saw the Battle of Rooiwal, the last major engagement of the war, where a Boer charge was beaten off by entrenched British troops.

The graves of the victims of both the concentration camps can still be visited today in the Old Cemetery Complex just outside town, numbering just below a thousand.

Desmond Tutu and Boer heritage
Today Klerksdorp is celebrated as the birthplace of Anglican Archbishop Emeritus Desmond Mpilo Tutu on October 7, 1931. He received the Nobel Peace Prize in 1984 for his work towards "a democratic and just society without racial divisions". The life work of Desmond Tutu has been to heal the scars left among the descendants of the many battles for control of South Africa. There is an irony of his birthplace set amidst Boer monuments and old battlefields, early settlements by those same Boers, among them famous leaders like Jacob de Clerq, even close to Witwatersrand where gold was discovered. He somehow managed to rise beyond pettiness and division to bring all these forces together with displaced native peoples in places such as this creating an international role model. He was later awarded multiple worldwide honours for his achievements in the reconciliation of the ethnic and cultural divisions in the history of his country.

Economic revival since 1932
The gold mining industry was revived by large mining companies in 1932 during the Free State Gold Rush, causing the town to undergo an economic revival, which accelerated after World War II.

Newspaper
The first local newspaper, "The Klerksdorp Pioneer" was published in 1887. In November 1888 it was replaced by George Vickers's newspaper "The Representative". This in turn was replaced by H.M Guest's "Klerksdorp Mining Record" in August 1899. It still exist as the "Klerksdorp Record".

Economy

Economic History 
In 1865, twenty-eight years after Klerksdorp had been founded, James Taylor opened the doors of the dofF's first trading store. During 1871 he was joined in a partnership by Thomas Smith Leask, a retired elephant-hunter and trader. The store, known as "Taylor and Leask", was the only one at Klerksdorp and became the centre of the town's activities and the rendevouz of hunters and traders who brought ivory and skins from the "interior" (Matebeleland and Mashonaland) and refitted for their next expedition. Both Taylor and Leask were on friendly terms with the majority of the hunters and F .C. Selous, a prolific letter-writer, visited the town several times. In one of his letters he mentioned that it had cost him £1 600 to outfit at the Klerksdorp store. When Taylor died of fever in 1878, Thomas Leask bought out Mrs Taylor and re-established the firm on his own account, as "Thomas Leask and Co.

Mining
The introduction in April 1890 of a new gold recovery process by Mr John S. McArthur and Dr Forrest (known as the McArthur Forrest Cyanide Process, and mentioned earlier) made it possible to recover most of the gold contents which had hitherto been lost. This process signalled a new era of prosperity and brought about a revival, since advantage was taken of the newly-discovered methods and cyanide plants were built on several local mines. 

Though the depression in the town was bad, several mines continued in production, and, coupled with agriculture, the slump was survived. Subsequent periods of depression and slumps have since hit the Klerksdorp district, but they have been mild in comparison with the dreadful experiences of 1889 and 1890. During December 1892 Thomas Leask, Managing Director of the Nooitgedacht mine, brought a glimmer of hope to some 200 people whom he addressed at the mine. He told the crowd that one thousand ounces of gold had been extracted. His daughter Lulu started the engine of the newly-installed five-stamp battery. The conventional bottle of champagne was broken and refreshments were served. 

After several mines had installed the new cyanide process, the gold output, which was merely about 7 000 ounces in 1890, increasesd to 10 967 in 1892 and 12 780 in 1893. By the end of 1895 there were 25 companies in existence and the gold output soared to a phenomenal 71 776 ounces -it now appeared as if the gold industry in Klerksdorp was firmly established and the depression of the late eighties was finally shaken off.

Geography

Climate
Klerksdorp has a semi-arid climate (BSk, according to the Köppen climate classification), with warm to hot summers and cool, dry winters.

Suburbs
Klerksdorp is divided into 35 suburbs

List of suburbs

Major cities
List of major cities near Klerksdorp.

Transport

Airport

PC Pelser Airport is a medium-sized airport in South Africa, serving the region of Klerksdorp.

Roads
N12 National Route
The road starts in George in the Western Cape and ends in eMalahleni in Mpumalanga. The section between the city and Potchefstroom is a dual carriage highway.

R30 provincial route

The R30 Road begins 16 kilometres north of Bloemfontein Central as an off-ramp of the N1 Highway (northbound only). From the R502 junction, the R30 continues northwards for 12 kilometres to enter the city as Church Street (Passing through the city centre) and reach an intersection with the N12 Highway as Chris Hani Road. From The N12 junction in Klerksdorp, the R30 heads northwards for 70 kilometres, meeting the R507 Road, to reach an intersection with the N14 National Route and enter the town of Ventersdorp.

R503 Regional Route

The R503 is a Regional Route in North West that connects Mahikeng with Klerksdorp via Lichtenburg and Coligny. From Hartbeesfontein, the R503 goes south-east for 20 kilometres to enter the city of Klerksdorp and reach its terminus at a T-junction with the N12 National Route in the suburb of Freemanvile (west of the town centre; north of Jouberton.

Railway

The first rail connection was that from Krugersdorp in 1897, the station was built by Netherlands–South African Railway Company and officially opened by President Kruger on the 3 August 1897. Just after the Anglo-Boer War, railway lines were extended to other parts of the country. In 1905 the line was extended to Vierfontein and Kroonstad. In 1906 Veertienstrome line was opened connecting Klerksdorp and Cape Town. In 1928 the link with Hartebeesfontein and Ottosdal followed.

Infrastructure

Electricity
The South African state-owned power company ESKOM operates several substations in the city.

Modern Klerksdorp
The greater city area surrounding Klerksdorp incorporates the towns of Orkney, Kanana, Stilfontein, Khuma, Hartbeesfontein and Tigane, giving it a population of more than 350,000 inhabitants (Census Statistics South Africa 2001). Together with Rustenburg, Klerksdorp forms the economic heart of North West Province. It is one of the hubs of the South African gold mining industry, although its importance has been decreasing in recent years. A major earthquake in March 2005 caused significant damage to the eastern suburb of Stilfontein and caused widespread damage to mining activities.
It is expected to be a large uranium producer in the future.

Apart from mining, Klerksdorp is positioned as a notable medical, retail and educational centre for North West Province and Northern Free State.

The Klerksdorp district is a major contributor to South African agriculture;   maize, sorghum, groundnuts and sunflower are important crops farmed in the district. Klerksdorp has the largest agricultural co-op in the southern hemisphere, named 'Senwes'. 

The farming district is also known for its Sussex cattle herds - the city is the headquarters of the South African Sussex Cattle Breeders Association.

Kingdom of Lesotho have a diplomatic post in the city. Several national departments and agencies have branches offices in the city (SARS and the Department of Home Affairs)

Education
In the city, there are numerous schools catered to primary and secondary schooling, as well as public and private.

The private schools for example are Klerksdorp Christian Academy, Curro Castle Klerksdorp, Methodist Primary School, Kingston Primary School, and Ashton John's School.

The public schools consist of Klerksdorp Primary School, Hoërskool Klerksdorp, Hoërskool Schoonspruit, Goudkop Primary School, Milner High School, Wesvalia High School, Laerskool La Hoff, Janie Schneider School, Laerskool Saamtrek, Manzilpark Primary School, Laerskool Meiringspark, Keurhof School, and New Vision Secondary School.

Banks
All of South Africa major banks like FNB,  ABSA, Standard Bank, Nedbank and Capitec Bank have branches in the city.

Landmarks
 Mining shafts excavated in the 1880s.
 The Klerksdorp Museum. It was built in 1891 as a prison and served as such until 1973. The house of the warden hosts period exhibitions. It exhibits the Klerksdorp spheres, spherical to subspherical objects that pseudoarcheologists consider to be man-made.
It has 30 species of game and 150 species of birds.
 The Oudorp hiking trail.
 Goudkoppie (Gold Hill) is the city's latest tourist attraction. It is situated near both the N12 highway and the Johannesburg-Cape Town railway line.
 The Johan Neser Dam (also known to the general public as Klerksdorp Dam)  outside Klerksdorp on the road to Ventersdorp.

Rio Casino Resort
The resort takes its name and inspiration from the Brazilian city, bringing a carnival atmosphere to the former Transvaal Republic. If the slots get too much, you can always head out on safari. At 266,330 square feet (24,743 m2), it is one of the largest casinos in the Southern Hemisphere and the world.

Matlosana Mall

The largest shopping centre in the North-West Province. The mall's retail mix of 145 stores is led by anchor retailers Checkers, Pick n Pay, Woolworths, Edgars and Foschini. It has fashion, lifestyle and sports retailers, as well as entertainment and restaurants.

Protea Hotel

Sport
The Harry Oppenheimer Stadium situated between Klerksdorp and Vaal River Operations is a popular sports field for some of the bigger schools' athletics competitions. The stadium was originally considered as one of the host cities for the 2010 FIFA World Cup but lost its bid to the Rustenburg Royal Bafokeng Stadium.

Notable people 
 Marco Jansen - South African cricketer
 Philemon Raul Masinga
 Ayanda Jiya
 Marnus Labuschagne - Australian cricketer

Gianfranco Cicogna-Mozzoni
Gianfranco Cicogna-Mozzoni died on 30 June 2012 at the Klerksdorp Air Show when his Aero L-39 Albatros got into the wake turbulence of the lead aircraft and suffered a compressor stall, followed by a high-speed wing stall, before hitting the ground at a 50-degree angle. The plane exploded on impact.

His great-grandfather was Giuseppe Volpi dei Misurata (1877-1947), known as Italy's Rockefeller, who served as the Italian Minister of Finance between 1910 and 1940, as well as the last Doge of Venice and Governor of North Africa. He brought electrical power to Italy, built the industrial port of Margera in Venice and started Italy's famous Ciga hotels and banking groups Banca Commerciale Italiana and Credito Commercio Italiano. The family was also involved in Rome's film industry, producing spaghetti Westerns.

Desmond Mpilo Tutu
Desmond Mpilo Tutu (7 October 1931 – 26 December 2021) was a South African Anglican bishop and theologian, known for his work as an anti-apartheid and human rights activist. He was Bishop of Johannesburg from 1985 to 1986 and then Archbishop of Cape Town from 1986 to 1996, in both cases being the first black African to hold the position. Theologically, he sought to fuse ideas from black theology with African theology.

Healthcare
Four private hospitals in the city lifts Klerksdorp's medical status in the North West Province. Adding to this is the advanced cancer treatment at some hospitals drawing in patients from all over the district.

Life Anncron Hospital
Life Anncron Hospital has modern and sophisticated facilities aimed at providing high-quality treatment and unique standards of care. This 150-bed facility is equipped to provide extensive medical treatment to patients whether they are admitted for routine, more serious, or extensive procedures. There are five theatres, several specialised intensive-care units, a 16-bed maternity unit and the only cardiology facility in the central region of the North West Province. Cardiology spectrum has the ability to do vascular and cardiac surgery on high-risk patients and patients with structural heart disease, and a fully integrated cardiac unit is available to patients.

Klerksdorp/Tshepong
Klerksdorp Tshepong Hospital Complex is a public district hospital in Klerksdorp, North West Province. Klerksdorp hospital was built in 1896, Tshepong hospital in 1978. In 1999 the two hospitals became a fully departmentalised Hospital complex.

Sunningdale Private Hospital
Sunningdale is situated in a tranquil suburb of Klerksdorp. From the moment you step through the doors of Sunningdale you will notice the difference from other hospitals. The hospital are divided into single, double and four bed rooms.

Law Enforcement
The latest crime statistics for Klerksdorp Police Precinct was issued by the South African Police Service (SAPS) in September 2012. The SAPS crime report showed the following information:

In comparison to other major towns and cities in South Africa, Klerksdorp is still considered one of the safer locations in the nation.

Other towns in the Klerksdorp district
 Hartbeesfontein
 Orkney
 Stilfontein

References

External links
 
 

Populated places established in 1837
Populated places in the City of Matlosana Local Municipality
Second Boer War concentration camps
Populated places founded by Afrikaners